For the location of the Olympic Village in Singapore, see Nanyang Technological University or 2010 Summer Youth Olympics#Youth Olympic VillageThe Vancouver Olympic Village (VVL), is an Olympic Village built by Millennium Development Group for the 2010 Winter Olympics and 2010 Winter Paralympics hosted in Vancouver, British Columbia, Canada. There are over a thousand units, ranging over a million square feet, that was able to accommodate over 2,800 athletes, coaches, and officials for the 2010 Winter Olympics.

The site, a former industrial area which mostly consisted of parking lots, is located on the shoreline at the southeast corner of False Creek, north of First Avenue between Ontario and Columbia Streets. Just south of Science World, its waterfront is part of the False Creek Seawall promenade and bike route, and is adjacent to the stations of the Granville Island Heritage Railway, the Spyglass Place pedestrian ferry wharf (served by Aquabus and False Creek Ferries), the Science World pedestrian ferry wharf (normally served by Aquabus and False Creek Ferries but closed temporarily from 25 January 2010 to 24 March 2010) and the Main Street and Olympic Village SkyTrain stations.

Whistler Olympic and Paralympic Village
The Whistler Olympic and Paralympic Village (WVL) is located in Whistler, British Columbia, it served the 2010 Winter Olympics and the 2010 Winter Paralympics. Smaller than the VVL, it accommodated 2,400 athletes, coaches, and officials with 450 beds made especially with wheelchair access. Site preparation began in 2006 with construction starting in March 2007 and it was completed in Summer 2009.

About
The site has 252 affordable housing units and another 100 units are for "modest market housing". Southeast False Creek is the designation given to the neighbourhood the Olympic Village resides in, bordered by Cambie, Main, West 2nd Avenue, and False Creek. The City of Vancouver projects that Southeast False Creek will eventually become home to up to 16,000 people by 2020.

The site currently boasts a 45,000 square foot community centre, named the Creekside Community Recreation Centre.

Construction

Preparation and construction of the site Vancouver began in February 2006. Construction was completed on 1 November 2009 by the Millennium Development Group, and turned over to the Vancouver Organizing Committee for the 2010 Olympic and Paralympic Winter Games (VANOC) for use during the Winter Games. On 7 April 2010 it was returned to the City of Vancouver. The village was converted into residential housing, a community centre, daycare, retail, and service spaces.

Residents released video documenting major problems with their units, including water pouring out of light fixtures, heat not working, cracks in ceilings, hardwood floors bubbling from moisture and bedrooms too small to fit a bed. More than 60 condo owners at the Village filed a class-action lawsuit against the builder. The lawsuits were subsequently dropped.

On 12 December 2014, the City of Vancouver unveiled a plaque honouring Millennium Development Group's role in designing, developing and constructing the Olympic Village, named "Millennium Water Olympic Village". The wording on the plaque states:

"North America's first LEED Platinum community was designed, developed and constructed by Peter and Shahram Malek's Millennium Development Group in time to open as the athletes' village for the successful Vancouver 2010 Olympic and Paralympic Winter Games.

Formerly an industrial site, Millennium Water Olympic Village was the catalyst for the revitalization of the surrounding False Creek neighbourhood and is a testament to the innovation, hard work and community spirit of the Malekyazdi family and hundreds of men and women who helped make this vision a reality."

Funding crisis
The project ran into cost overruns and a variety of financial issues. In September 2007, a complex three way deal was struck to complete the village with minimal public money: the developer, Millennium Developments, would build the project and sell the units as condominiums, borrowing funds from New York-based investment firm Fortress Investment Group, with the City of Vancouver acting as guarantor, leasing the land to Millennium until the games were complete.

Amid high supply and labour costs, slow condo sales, and the ongoing U.S. subprime mortgage crisis, Fortress halted its funds in September 2008, leaving Millennium in "anticipatory default". Thus, the city in its role as guarantor became responsible for finding funds to complete the project. In October 2008, city council advanced $100 million to Millennium, which was not made public until three weeks after. The city's Chief Financial Officer resigned shortly before the municipal election in November 2008.

The election resulted in the defeat of the NPA: candidate Peter Ladner was defeated, and Vision Vancouver gained control of council and the mayoralty. Ladner's defeat has been directly ascribed to the secret loan, as Vision promised more transparency in the city's finances.

At the beginning of 2009, costs continued to go over budget and the city faced a $458 million shortfall. On 15 January 2009, the deputy city manager overseeing construction of the Olympic Village resigned. Prime minister Stephen Harper ruled out any possibility of a bailout from the federal government.

With time running out, mayor Gregor Robertson made a request to the provincial government to amend the Vancouver Charter to allow the city to borrow extra funds, asserting that losses would be mitigated by rising property values. On 18 January 2009, an emergency meeting of the Legislative Assembly approved Bill 47, the Vancouver Charter Amendment Act,  allowing the City of Vancouver to borrow unlimited sums for the Olympic Village--without the ordinary voter referendum required by previous legislation. The city then proceeded to buy out Fortress's share of the project, becoming the sole lender to Millennium.

In November 2010, seven months after the successful completion of the games, the village's holding company and the City of Vancouver agreed to place the property into voluntary receivership.

In 2014, a Vancouver Sun'' review by a Vancouver developer praised Millennium for creating the Vancouver Olympic Village under trying circumstances. The same year, the city sold off the last shares in the project and cleared its debt from 2009. A later assessment in 2020 regarded the project as a success, creating a thriving neighbourhood.

Australia banner controversy
A giant banner hung from the Village by members of the Australian team attracted controversy in early February 2010 when a member of the International Olympic Committee toured the site and expressed concern that it might contravene policy, as the banner is not the flag of Australia but rather depicts a kangaroo wearing boxing gloves. The Australian deputy prime minister at the time Julia Gillard called the request for the banner's removal a disgrace. According to a representative of the Australian team, the flag has been at every Olympic Village since the 2000 Games in Sydney. The image had flown from the victorious Australian yacht in the 1983 America's Cup and is now a mascot of Australia's Olympic teams; the Australian Olympic Committee owns the image's trademark. After IOC president Jacques Rogge discussed the issue with John Coates, chief of the AOC, it was confirmed that the flag could remain at the Olympic Village. "While the IOC is of the view that the display of the boxing kangaroo at the Olympic village is a breach of the IOC rules relating to clean venues, the IOC is not going to request us to take down the boxing kangaroo flag on this occasion," Coates said. The AOC was required to register the image with the IOC. The controversy sparked a demand for a version of the boxing-kangaroo flag at a Vancouver flag shop.

References

External links

 Vancouver2010.com profile
 Government of British Columbia
 City of Vancouver
 News and photographs of the completed Vancouver Olympic Village
 Photograph of the construction of the Olympic Village in False Creek
 Photograph of Olympic Village footbridge installation Dec 2007
 Vancouver releases secret Olympic Village documents, Bob Mackin, The Tyee, 19 June 2009
 The Growing Pains of Vancouver - Internet radio documentary discussing the Olympic Village from 45'21" till 64'24".

Olympic Village, 2010
British Columbia political scandals
Buildings and structures in Vancouver
Olympic Villages